Khatuniyah is a village near al-Hawl in eastern al-Hasakah Governorate, northeastern Syria.

The village is located on a small peninsula at the northeastern shore of al-Khatuniyah Lake (close to the border with Iraq.

Administratively the village belongs to the al-Hawl Nahiya of al-Hasakah District. At the 2004 census, it had a population of 1,218.

History
During the Syrian Civil War, the area was occupied by the Islamic State. The village was however captured on 11 November 2015 by the Syrian Democratic Forces in the course of their al-Hawl offensive.

References

Villages in al-Hasakah Governorate
Populated places in al-Hasakah District